Wayaobu may refer to:
Wayaobu Subdistrict, a subdistrict in Zichang, Yan'an, Shaanxi, China
Wayaobu Manifesto